The Young Socialists (Młodzi Socjaliści) was a Polish political organisation formed in 2005 and dissolved in 2015. Membership was open to those aged 16–35 (35+ could join as supporters).

The organisation was defined by its argument that there was no authentic left-wing party in the Polish Parliament.

It was an observer member of the European Left. In 2015 members and former members of Young Socialists participated in the foundation of Razem.

References

External links
Official site

2005 establishments in Poland
2015 disestablishments in Poland
Defunct organisations based in Poland
Party of the European Left
Socialist organisations in Poland